Boleslaw (Swedish: Burislev; died 1172/73) was a Swedish pretender for the throne, belonging to the House of Sverker. He acted in concert with his kinsman Kol against King Canute I of Sweden, then head of the House of Eric. The two pretenders, who were brothers, half-brothers, or uncle and nephew, may never have controlled much more than the Province of Östergötland, which was the base of the dynasty. Boleslaw is believed either to have been murdered by King Canute's men, or to have fled to Poland in or before 1173.

Background

Boleslaw was a descendant of the old King Sverker I of Sweden (d. 1156), but the exact pedigree is not clear. Sverker married, as his second wife, Richeza of Poland. From this marriage a son called Bulizlaus (Boleslaw, Burislev) was born, as apparent from a Danish administrative document. He was named for his maternal grandfather Bolesław III Wrymouth. Older Swedish historians, such as Natanael Beckman who wrote a biographical article in Svenskt biografiskt lexikon, therefore claimed that Boleslaw and Kol were sons of Sverker.

However, according to a medieval genealogy, Boleslaw, Kol and a third brother called Ubbe the Strong were in fact the sons of King Sverker I's son John. On the basis of this, Swedish historians such as Nils Ahnlund and Adolf Schück have claimed instead that there were two different Boleslaw, uncle and nephew; thus the contenders were indeed sired by John, who died a young man in c. 1152. A medieval list of monastic donations indicates that a certain Ragnhild was the mother of Kol and probably Boleslaw, and consequently the wife of John. She is known to have survived him and presumably raised her children during the turbulent years following John's and Sverker I's deaths, before entering Vreta Abbey as a nun.

Civil war

Boleslaw is mentioned in the regnal list appended to Västgötalagen together with Kol: "King Canute I won Sweden with his sword and killed King Kol and King Burislev, and had many battles against Sweden and was victorious in them all." Otherwise, he appears in fewer medieval sources than his brother whose name occurs in several king-lists. According to annotations by the 17th-century scholar Johannes Messenius, Kol fell in battle, but Boleslaw continued the struggle against Canute with some success. However, when he carelessly stayed at the mansion of Bjälbo he was assaulted by Canute's troops and killed. Still later traditions have it that Kol and then Boleslaw were killed in battle at Blodåkrarna (the Blood Fields) close to Bjälbo, in 1169. Most probably, however, the struggle came to an end in 1172–73, since Canute reportedly reigned for 23 years after his victory.

It has been speculated that Canute I married a sister of his antagonists Kol and Boleslaw whose name was Cecilia, and to whom he was betrothed in c. 1160. This hypothesis is based on an annal entry which mentions a Princess Cecilia, mother of Eric the Saint, as the sister of Kol and Ulf (Ubbe). Eric the Saint, it is  argued, might be a mistake for Eric X of Sweden, the son of Canute I. This hypothesis has been disputed, however.

Though several sources affirm that Boleslaw actually was King of Sweden for a few years, the Swedish Royal Court does not recognize him as such in its official list of rulers.

References 

12th-century Swedish monarchs
Year of birth missing
1169 deaths